Nuyts Land District is a land district (cadastral division) of Western Australia, located within the Eastern and Eucla land divisions on the Nullarbor Plain. It spans roughly 31°00'S - 32°50'S in latitude and 124°00'E - 125°30'E in longitude.

Location and features
The district is located on the Nullarbor Plain in the south-east of the state and falls generally between the Great Australian Bight to the south and the Trans-Australian Railway to the north. The Caiguna roadhouse on the Eyre Highway and the railway town of Rawlinna are located within its boundaries.
Nuyts is the location of the Nuytsland Nature Reserve, a protected area on the southern coast of the district.

History

The district was created on 4 March 1903 and named in honor of the infamous Pieter Nuyts, the highest ranking member of the Dutch East India Company aboard the 't Gulden Zeepaert when it mapped the southwestern Australian coast, after which it was sometimes mapped as Nuytsland. The district originally only extended north to 31°30'S latitude. When the Trans-Australian Railway was being built in 1914, the district was extended northwards and was defined in the Government Gazette:

References

Land districts of Western Australia
Goldfields-Esperance